KVET may refer to:

 KVET (AM), a radio station (1300 AM) licensed to Austin, Texas, United States
 KVET-FM, a radio station (98.1 FM) licensed to Austin, Texas, United States